Histioea paraensis is a moth of the subfamily Arctiinae. It was described by Joaquim Pereira Machado Jr. and Alfredo Rei do Régo Barros in 1971. It is found in Brazil.

References

Arctiinae
Moths described in 1971